Anziaic acid is a depside found in lichens. It gives a red reaction in the C test. The two phenolic rings have a pentyl side chain. It is an ester dimer of olivetolic acid.

Anziaic acid works as an antibacterial compound by inhibiting topoisomerase.

Production
Anziaic acid has been artificially produced from olivetolic acid by benzylation of the O-phenol positions, and then condensing with trifluoroacetic anhydride.

Properties
Anziaic acid is colourless. It can be dissolved in ethanol, ethanol-water mixture, or cyclohexane-benzene mixture.

Related
Perlatolic acid, dihydropicrolichenic acid, 2'-O-methylanziaic acid,  2-O-methylperlatolic acid, 2'-O-methylperlatolic and planaic acid are derivatives of anziaic acid, where a methyl group replaces a hydrogen in some of the hydroxy positions on the rings.

Occurrence
Anziaic acid is found in Parmeliaceae including Hypotrachyna, Stereocaulon, and Cetrelia,

References

Carboxylate esters
Polyphenols
Lichen products